Adam Thomas Mitter (born 5 January 1993) is an English professional footballer who plays as a centre-back for Thai League 2 club Krabi.

A prolific journeyman for his age, Mitter has played at senior level for a total of fifteen different clubs in nine countries, including England, Scotland, Sweden, Australia, the Philippines, India, Singapore, Canada, Indonesia and Thailand.

Playing career

Preston North End
In early 2009, Mitter joined the youth academy of Championship club Preston North End.

Blackpool
In summer 2009, Mitter signed a two-year youth contract with English Premier League side Blackpool. During his time with the Seasiders, Mitter captained both the U18 team and the reserve team.

Hibernian
In August 2011, Mitter signed with Scottish Premier League side Hibernian.

Kettering Town
After leaving Hibs in autumn 2012, Mitter signed with newly relegated Southern Football League Premier Division club Kettering Town in early November as part of a major re-build of the squad. He was named captain at age 19 and made three appearances for Kettering before leaving the club in late November.

Warrington Town
On 1 December 2012, Mitter signed with Northern Premier League Division One North side Warrington Town.

Ånge IF
In January 2013, Mitter signed with Swedish Division 3 side Ånge IF despite offers in Iceland and Australia. Mitter was again named captain and helped the club earn promotion to Division 2.

Barrow
After a successful season in Sweden, Mitter returned to England and signed with Northern Premier League Premier Division side Barrow on 25 November 2013.

Chorley
Only a few weeks after joining Barrow however, Mitter signed with NPL Premier Division leaders Chorley on 16 December 2013.

West Torrens Birkalla
In 2014, Mitter signed in Australia with NPL South Australia side West Torrens Birkalla. He made 16 appearances that season as the Birks finished 11th out of 14.

Loyola Meralco
In January 2015, Mitter signed with Filipino United Football League club Loyola Meralco Sparks. He settled well in the country and helped the club win the 2014-15 PFF National Men's Cup and finish second in the league. After his first season, he extended his contract with the Sparks with the goal of winning the league title.

Stafford Rangers
In August 2016, Mitter returned to the Northern Premier League Premier Division, signing with Stafford Rangers.

Fateh Hyderabad
Turning out for Fateh Hyderabad for the 2016-17 I-League 2nd Division, the English centre-back stated that Indian football was on the rise, going on to say that it would someday match the big leagues. Mitter would also take up the role as club captain and guide them to the highest league finish and lowest number of goals conceded in the I-League 2nd Division preliminary round.

Ilocos United
In September 2017, Mitter returned to the Philippines to play for Philippines Football League side Ilocos United, where he was named captain of the team.

Hougang United
In January 2018, Mitter signed with Singaporean club Hougang United for the 2018 Singapore Premier League after receiving other offers in India and Malaysia.

Global Cebu
In July 2018, Mitter signed with Philippines Football League side Global Cebu, marking Mitter's third spell in the Philippines.

Valour FC
On 12 April 2019, Mitter signed with newly founded Canadian Premier League club Valour ahead of their inaugural season. That year, he made twenty league appearances and one appearance in the Canadian Championship. On 29 November 2019, the club announced that Mitter would not be returning for the following season.

Persiraja Banda Aceh
On 8 January 2020, Mitter signed a year contract with indonesian Liga 1 side Persiraja Banda Aceh. On 29 February 2020, Mitter made his competitive debut by starting in a 0–0 draw at Bhayangkara. On 10 December, Mitter decided to terminate his contract with Persiraja, it is almost certain that there will be no official professional football competition until the end of 2020. PSSI and PT LIB have decided to postpone the competition until February next year.

Rayong
In January 2021, Mitter agreed to join newly promoted Thai League 1 side Rayong.

Persita Tangerang
On 4 May 2021, Mitter signed a year contract with indonesian Liga 1 side Persita Tangerang. On 28 August, Mitter made his competitive debut by starting in a 1–2 win at Persipura Jayapura. He only made ten appearances with the club.

PSM Makassar
On 12 January 2022, Mitter signed a contract with indonesian Liga 1 side PSM Makassar.

Personal life
Mitter's great-great-grandfather was from Calcutta, India and emigrated to England.

Honours
Ånge IF
Swedish Division 3, Förbundsserie Group: 2013

Chorley
Northern Premier League Premier Division: 2013–14

Loyola Meralco
PFF National Men's Club Championship: 2014–15

References

External links

1993 births
Living people
Association football defenders
English footballers
Sportspeople from Shrewsbury
English people of Indian descent
English expatriate footballers
Expatriate footballers in Sweden
English expatriate sportspeople in Sweden
Expatriate soccer players in Australia
English expatriate sportspeople in Australia
Expatriate footballers in the Philippines
English expatriate sportspeople in the Philippines
Expatriate footballers in India
English expatriate sportspeople in India
Expatriate footballers in Singapore
English expatriate sportspeople in Singapore
Expatriate soccer players in Canada
English expatriate sportspeople in Canada
Expatriate footballers in Indonesia
English expatriate sportspeople in Indonesia
English expatriate sportspeople in Thailand
Expatriate footballers in Thailand
Hibernian F.C. players
Kettering Town F.C. players
Warrington Town F.C. players
Ånge IF players
Barrow A.F.C. players
Chorley F.C. players
F.C. Meralco Manila players
Stafford Rangers F.C. players
Fateh Hyderabad A.F.C. players
Ilocos United F.C. players
Hougang United FC players
Global Makati F.C. players
Valour FC players
Persiraja Banda Aceh players
Adam Mitter
Persita Tangerang players
PSM Makassar players
Adam Mitter
Southern Football League players
Northern Premier League players
Division 3 (Swedish football) players
National Premier Leagues players
I-League 2nd Division players
Singapore Premier League players
Philippines Football League players
Canadian Premier League players
Liga 1 (Indonesia) players
Adam Mitter